Gaoming Township is an rural township in Anhua County, Yiyang, Hunan Province, People's Republic of China.

Administrative division
The township is divided into 12 villages, the following areas: Gaomingpu Village, Shiyan Village, Shilong Village, Situpu Village, Jiu'an Village, Meimao Village, Xingzhuang Village, Yinshan Village, Heinitian Village, Yitoupu Village, Qingfeng Village, and Tongjian Village (高明铺村、石岩村、适龙村、司徒铺村、久安村、眉毛村、星庄村、阴山村、黑泥田村、驿头铺村、青丰村、同建村).

References

External links

Divisions of Anhua County